Aeque principaliter ("equally important") is a Latin term used by the Roman Catholic Church to indicate a merger of two or more dioceses in which – to avoid questions of predominance – the dioceses are all given equal importance. Such a merger often followed a merger in persona episcopi.

Examples
 Diocese of Atri merged aeque principaliter with the Diocese of Penne (15 March 1252 to 1 July 1949)
 Diocese of Prato united aeque principaliter with Diocese of Pistoia (from 22 September 1653 to 25 January 1954)
 Diocese of Bitonto united aeque principaliter to Diocese of Ruvo (from 27 June 1818 to 30 September 1982)
Diocese of Brugnato united aeque principaliter with Diocese of Luni-Sarzana (from 2 October 1820 to 30 September 1986)
 Diocese of Cervia united aeque principaliter with the Archdiocese of Ravenna (from 22 February 1947 to 30 September 1986)

See also

 Canon law (Catholic Church)

Catholic Church legal terminology
Catholic canonical structures
Episcopacy in the Catholic Church